Unterelsaß (also spelled Unterelsass, meaning Lower Alsace) was the northern part of the historical region Alsace or Elsass, inhabited originally by locals speaking Alemannic German. From 1871 to 1918, Bezirk Unterelsaß was the name for the central district (Bezirk) of the imperial territory of Elsaß-Lothringen (Alsace-Lorraine) in the German Empire.

Administrative and political organization
According to the census 1886 the district of Lower Alsace comprised:
 8 subdistricts ("Kreise")
 31 cantons 
 560 municipalities 
 area   
 612.078 inhabitants (Males 299.456 Females 312.622)
 Catholics 381.748  Protestants 209.199  Jews 19.848  Other faiths 1.220

Capital and subdistricts
The capital of the district was Straßburg. 
There were the 8 subdistricts ("Kreise") of
 Erstein
 Hagenau (Haguenau)
 Molsheim
 Schlettstadt (Sélestat)
 Straßburg, Land (county of Straßburg) (Strasbourg)
 Weißenburg (Wissembourg)
 Zabern (Saverne)
 Stadtkreis Straßburg

The official flag
The flag is a white bar in a red field decorated on each side with a white lace motif. The union of this flag with that of Oberelsaß forms the flag of modern Alsace.

Annexed municipalities from the neighbor department
The district of Unterelsaß corresponds exactly to the current département of Bas-Rhin, but not to the Alsatian territory before 1870. 
Under the terms of a particular agreement  that was signed in Berlin July 21, 1871, and in Paris July 31, 1871, 18 municipalities of the Vosges department were integrated into the new imperial district of Lower Alsace, subdistrict of Molsheim, canton of Schirmeck.

Barembach
Bourg-Bruche
La Broque
Colroy-la-Roche
Grandfontaine
Natzvillers
Neuviller-la-Roche
Plaine
Ranrupt
Rothau 
Russ
Saales
Saint-Blaise-la-Roche
Saulxures
Schirmeck
Waldersbach
Wildersbach
Wisches

In earlier times Rothau, Wildersbach, Waldersbach, Neuvillers belonged to the principality of Ban de la Roche before they joined the département of the Vosges in 1790. The other ones were located in the former Duchy of Lorraine.

The inhabitants of these municipalities didn't and still don't speak any German dialect (Lower Alemannic) such as their neighbors. The linguistic boundary runs between Wisches and Lutzelhouse. The people of the annexed towns speaks a Romance language from the Langues d'oïl, Lorraine family, such as some municipalities in the district of Upper Alsace. This cultural particularity stresses the fact that the annexation of French territories by the German Empire not always referred to the pan-nationalist political idea (Pan-Germanism trying to unite all German-speaking people. When Alsace was recovered by France in 1919 it was decided not to return the 18 annexed municipalities  to their former Department(Vosges).  Thus in terms of departmental boundaries, the mountain region remains administratively separated from the western portion of the Vosges mountains. Nowadays the inhabitants of the Bruche valley basically identify themselves with Lower Alsatians regardless of their cultural identity.

First German federal elections 1874
The subjects of the Reichsland Alsace-Lorraine could exercise their right to vote for the deputies at the Reichtstag in Berlin February 1, 1874. Among ten deputies for Alsace, six were catholic clerics and the most of the deputies belonged to the French protest party.

The name of the deputies for Lower Alsace were as follows: 
Hartmann, Ludwig, factory owner, WK Elsaß-Lothringen 10 (Hagenau, Weißenburg), Elsaß-Lothringer
Lauth, Ernest, mayor of Strasbourg, WK Elsaß-Lothringen 8 (Straßburg), Französische Protestpartei
Philippi, Joseph, priest, WK Elsaß-Lothringen 7 (Molsheim, Erstein), Elsaß-Lothringer
Räß, Andreas, bishop of Strasbourg, WK Elsaß-Lothringen 6 (Schlettstadt), Elsaß-Lothringer
Schauenburg, Alexis von, landowner, WK Elsaß-Lothringen 9 (Straßburg-Land), Elsaß-Lothringer
Teutsch, Eduard, landowner, WK Elsaß-Lothringen 11 (Zabern), Französische Protestpartei

Third German federal election, 1877

In the third election of January 10, 1877, the Alsatians of the District Lower Alsace elected the following deputies:

Gustav Adolf Bergmann, Straßburg-Stadt Els.-Lothringer
Louis Heckmann-Stintzy, Schlettstadt Els.-Lothringer    
Xaver Joseph Nessel, Hagenau, Weißenburg Els.-Lothringer
Jean North, Straßburg-Land Els.-Lothringer  
Achille Rack Molsheim, Erstein Els.-Lothringer   
Carl August Schneegans, Zabern Els.-Lothringer

Fourth German federal election, July 30, 1878

The Lower Alsatian deputies for the next legislative period 1878-1881 are as follows:
 Goldenberg, Alfred, factory owner, WK Elsaß-Lothringen 11 (Zabern), Elsaß-Lothringer 
 Heckmann-Stintzy, Louis, WK Elsaß-Lothringen 6 (Schlettstadt), Elsaß-Lothringer
Kable, Jacques, director of an insurance company, WK Elsaß-Lothringen 8 (Straßburg), Elsaß-Lothringer
Rack, Achille, Mayor of Benfeld, WK Elsaß-Lothringen 7 (Molsheim, Erstein), Elsaß-Lothringer
Schmitt-Batiston, Alfred, land owner, WK Elsaß-Lothringen 10 (Hagenau, Weißenburg), Elsaß-Lothringer
Schneegans, Carl August, Director of Elsässer Journal, WK Elsaß-Lothringen 11 (Zabern), Elsaß-Lothringer

Fifth German federal elections 1881
The elections for the fifth legislative period (1881-1884) of the Imperial Diet took place October 27, 1881. These are the results of the elections for Lower Alsace:
 
Dietrich, Eugéne de, ironmaster, WK Elsaß-Lothringen 10 (Hagenau, Weißenburg), Elsaß-Lothringer
Goldenberg, Alfred, factory-owner, WK Elsaß-Lothringen 11 (Zabern), Elsaß-Lothringer
Kablé, Jacques, director of an insurance company, WK Elsaß-Lothringen 8 (Straßburg-Stadt), Elsaß-Lothringer
Lang, Irénée, manufacturer, WK Elsaß-Lothringen 6 (Schlettstadt), Zentrum
Quirin, Michael, landowner, WK Elsaß-Lothringen 9 (Straßburg-Land), Elsaß-Lothringer
Zorn von Bulach, Hugo, WK Elsaß-Lothringen 7 (Molsheim, Erstein), Elsaß-Lothringer

See also
 Bas-Rhin
 Alsace-Lorraine

References

External links
For all deputies of the Imperial Diet see database
Les députés "protestataires" d'Alsace-Lorraine (French)
 Digitalisat

Sources

For the federal elections
Georg Hirth (Hrsg.): Deutscher Parlamentsalmanach 13. Ausgabe, September 1878. Leipzig, 1878 (Digitalisat)
Stenographische Berichte über die Verhandlungen des Deutschen Reichstags. 4. Legislatur-Periode, I. Session 1878. 1. Band, Berlin 1878, S. VII–XXVII (Digitalisat)
Stenographische Berichte über die Verhandlungen des Deutschen Reichstags. 4. Legislatur-Periode, II. Session 1879. 1. Band, Berlin 1879, S. IX–XXIX (Digitalisat)
Stenographische Berichte über die Verhandlungen des Deutschen Reichstags. 4. Legislatur-Periode, III. Session 1880. 1. Band, Berlin 1880, S. XXIX–XLIX (Digitalisat)
Stenographische Berichte über die Verhandlungen des Deutschen Reichstags. 4. Legislatur-Periode, IV. Session 1881. 1. Band, Berlin 1881, S. XXXIII–LIII (Digitalisat)
Georg Hirth (Hrsg.): Deutscher Parlamentsalmanach 14. Ausgabe, November 1881. Leipzig 1881, daten.digitale-sammlungen.de
Stenographische Berichte über die Verhandlungen des Deutschen Reichstags. 5. Legislatur-Periode, I. Session 1881. 1. Band. Berlin 1881, reichstagsprotokolle.de
Wilhelm Heinz Schröder: Sozialdemokratische Reichstagsabgeordnete und Reichstagskandidaten 1898–1918. Biographisch-statistisches Handbuch. (= Handbücher zur Geschichte des Parliamentarismus und der politischen Parteien, Band 2). Droste, Düsseldorf 1986, 
Bernd Haunfelder: Reichstagsabgeordnete der Deutschen Zentrumspartei 1871–1933. Biographisches Handbuch und historische Photographien. (= Photodokumente zur Geschichte des Parliamentarismus und der politischen Parteien, Band 4). Droste, Düsseldorf 1999, 
Bernd Haunfelder: Die liberalen Abgeordneten des deutschen Reichstags 1871–1918. Ein biographisches Handbuch. Aschendorff, Münster 2004, 
Bernd Haunfelder: Die konservativen Abgeordneten des deutschen Reichstags von 1871 bis 1918. Ein biographisches Handbuch. Aschendorff, Münster 2009, 

History of Alsace
History of Lorraine
Lower Alsace